__notoc__

Konstantin Alexandrovich Posse (September 29, 1847 - August 24, 1928) was a Russian mathematician known for contributions to analysis and in particular approximation theory. Veniamin Kagan and D. D. Morduhai-Boltovskoi were among his students.

Selected publications

Notes

Further reading

External links
 

1847 births
1928 deaths
Mathematical analysts
Approximation theorists
Russian mathematicians
19th-century mathematicians from the Russian Empire
20th-century Russian mathematicians
Academic staff of Odesa University
Saint Petersburg State University alumni